The 2012 Liaoning Whowin F.C. season is Liaoning's 3rd consecutive season in the Chinese Super League. Liaoning will also be competing in the Chinese FA Cup.

Players

Competitions

Chinese Super League

League table

Matches

Chinese FA Cup

References

Liaoning F.C. seasons
Liaoning Whowin F.C.